Hervey Bay is a bay of the Coral Sea in the Bundaberg Region and Fraser Coast Region of Queensland, Australia. It is known for its whale watching.

History 
Hervey Bay was logged by Lieutenant James Cook on 21 May 1770 on his exploration of the eastern Australian coast in the HM Bark Endeavour. He named it Hervey's Bay after his return to England, after Admiral Augustus John Hervey who was Lord of the Admiralty from 1771 to 1775.

In July and August 1799 Matthew Flinders chartered the coast from Moreton Bay to Hervey Bay in the Norfolk. Although he established that Fraser Island was not a peninsula (as was then believed) but an island, he failed to find a navigable channel through the Great Sandy Strait which separates the island from the mainland. His explorations of the area is commemorated by a monument called Matthew Flinders Lookout at the top of an escarpment facing the bay in Dayman Park, Urangan.

Lieutenant Joseph Dayman was the first to navigate through the Great Sandy Strait on 10 November 1846 in a small decked boat called the Asp. It had been intended that Dayman rendezvous with HMS Rattlesnake but that ship had already departed. Dayman decided it was safer to take the Asp through the Great Sandy Strait rather than risk taking the route to the ocean side of the Fraser Island as he was concerned about the Breakpoint Spit at the north of Fraser Island.

Whales 

Hervey Bay is a resting place during the annual migration of approximately 35,000 humpback whales along Australia's east coast from the Great Barrier Reef down to the Antarctic Ocean. This migration involves approximately one third of the world's humpback whales. Most female whales each spend about two weeks in Hervey Bay nursing their calves. Young whales also rest in the bay but very few adult male whales rest in the bay. Whales can normally be seen in the bay between July and November each year, where they exhibit many playful behaviours. There are many companies offering whale watching tours in the bay during that time. There are strict rules applying to the operation of boats in the vicinity of whales to avoid harm or stress to the whales. Due to the popularity of the albino whale Migaloo (first sighted in 1991), there are particularly strict rules relating to approaching Migaloo or any seemingly white whale that might be Migaloo.

Southern right whales have also been recorded with increasing sighting rates.

References 

Bays of Queensland
Bundaberg Region
Fraser Coast Region